Pyralis kacheticalis is a species of snout moth. It is found in Ukraine and on Cyprus, as well as in Turkey and Russia.

The wingspan is about 16–17 mm.

References

Moths described in 1893
Pyralini
Insects of Turkey